These Cities, Our Graves is the first full-length album released by the New Zealand metalcore band Antagonist A.D. It was released in August 2006. In 2008 the album was re-released in Australia on Trial & Error Records, featuring two more songs, "Distance" and "Stranger", which are both on the 2007 Distance EP.

Track listing
2006 release
  "These Cities, Our Graves" - "1:12"
  "The Walking Dead" - "2:53"
  "Hollywood" - "3:14"
  "Show Some Heart (Go Vegan)" - "2:46"
  "R.E.S.P.E.C.T" - "3:05"
  "The Birth of Tragedy" - "2:49"
  "(Not Even) Silver Bullets" - "2:44"
  "Suicide Girls" - "2:34"
  "Q. What Do You Call Getting A Handjob From Mrs Calloway In The Back Of Her Jaguar? A. A Fucking Lie" - "3:18"

2008 re-release
 "Distance" - "2:46"
 "Stranger" - "2:27"

External links 
 These Cities, Our Graves review at FasterLouder

2006 debut albums
Antagonist A.D. albums